Ben Volavola (born 13 January 1991) is an Australian-born Fijian international rugby union footballer who plays for Racing 92. Volavola can play as either a fly-half or full back.

Early life
Ben Volavola was born in Sydney, Australia and is of Fijian and Indo-Fijian descent. He is the grandson of former Suva Mayor, Ratu Peni Volavola, and of the former Suva netball representative Vasiti Mea Naqova. He moved back to Fiji during his early years.

Education
Volavola returned to Australia from Fiji aged nine and in his secondary schooling years attended St George Christian School (2004), Endeavour Sports High School (2005–2008) and Newington College (2009–2010).

He attended Veiuto Primary School before he left for Australia where he first learnt how to play rugby, but moved back to Sydney in 2000 with his mother (Ema Volavola) and younger brother Milan before he started high School.

In 2012, he completed his Certificate III and IV in Fitness at the Australian Institute of Fitness in 2012. He also finished a Business Diploma with the Australian Vocational Training Academy.

Rugby career

Super Rugby
His performances for Southern Districts in the Shute Shield have earned him a spot in the  Extended Playing Squad for the 2013 Super Rugby season. He represented Australia Under 20 in the 2011 IRB Junior World Championship in Italy.

Volavola signed for the Crusaders in the 2016 Super Rugby season to replace a number 10 exodus at the Crusaders with Dan Carter, Colin Slade and Tom Taylor who are moving to play rugby in Europe as well as confirming his eligibility to join Fiji for the upcoming 2015 Rugby World Cup. He signed a two-year deal.

After getting picked by Fiji for the upcoming 2015 World Rugby Pacific Nations Cup, he intends to make the 10 jersey which was worn by former Fijian flyhalf, Nicky Little who Volavola regards as one of his heroes. His parents, Dinesh Shankar and Ema Volavola have been supportive of their son's decision to represent Fiji.

He came off the bench against Māori All Blacks on his debut in the 2015 mid-year rugby union internationals as Fiji had given the match, test status.

He started at 10 for Fiji against Tonga in the 2015 World Rugby Pacific Nations Cup scoring 15 points (3 conversions and 3 penalties).

He was named one of Fiji's 31 man squad for the Rugby World Cup 2015 which was hosted in England and Wales. He played all 4 matches, against all three of the biggest teams in Fiji's group; England (lost 35–11), Australia (lost 28–13) and Wales (lost 23–13) and the last against Uruguay where Fiji won 45–17.

In January 2017, he signed for Australian super rugby side, Melbourne Rebels. He played for one season before leaving the club.

France
In October 2017, after playing all of his professional career in the Super Rugby, NRC, and Mitre 10 Cup Volavola signed for French Top 14 club Bordeaux Bègles. Confirmation was released in November 2017. He joined Fijian teammate Peni Ravai.

In June 2018, Volavola signed for his 2nd french club, Racing 92 as a backup to injured playmaker Pat Lambie.

On 10 May 2020, Volavola sign for Pro D2 side Perpignan ahead of the 2020-21 season.

Super Rugby statistics

Personal life
In October 2017, Volavola was seen with actress Shailene Woodley on multiple occasions. The duo later posted several photos of each other on social media, confirming their relationship, and in January 2018, Woodley posted a picture of Volavola saying "damn I love him".

In April 2020 it was reported that the relationship with Woodley had ended.

References

1991 births
Australian rugby union players
Fijian rugby union players
Australian people of Indo-Fijian descent
New South Wales Waratahs players
Greater Sydney Rams players
Rugby union fly-halves
Rugby union fullbacks
Rugby union players from Sydney
People educated at Newington College
Living people
Fijian people of Indian descent
Fijian people of I-Taukei Fijian descent
Australian people of I-Taukei Fijian descent
Sportspeople of Indian descent
Crusaders (rugby union) players
Canterbury rugby union players
Melbourne Rebels players
Union Bordeaux Bègles players
Racing 92 players
USA Perpignan players
People educated at Endeavour Sports High School
Australian sportspeople of Indian descent
Fiji international rugby union players
Expatriate rugby union players in France
Australian expatriate rugby union players
North Harbour rugby union players